Joseph William Polisi (born 1947) was the President of The Juilliard School from 1984 to May 2017, having assumed the position upon the death of his predecessor, Peter Mennin.

Born in New York City to an Italian family, Dr. Polisi is the son of William Polisi, a bassoonist who performed with the New York Philharmonic.  He was instrumental in the construction of Juilliard's Meredith Willson Residence Hall, and has focused his tenure on "community building". Polisi is the author of The Artist as Citizen, a book which implores the classical music world to reach out to society at large.

Education 
Joseph Polisi earned a B.A. in Political Science from the University of Connecticut, an M.A. in International Relations from The Fletcher School of Law and Diplomacy at Tufts University, and a D.M.A. from Yale University in 1980. Polisi studied the bassoon with his late father, and performed through his undergraduate years. He also studied with Maurice Allard at the Conservatoire de Paris, France, from 1973 to 1974.

Professional career 
Polisi was the Executive Officer of the Yale School of Music (1976–1980), then served in the capacity as Dean of the Music Department at the Manhattan School of Music (1983–1984), and the University of Cincinnati College-Conservatory of Music from 1983-1984.

Polisi has performed with the Juilliard Orchestra.

Works

References

External links

Interviews 
Dr. Joseph Polisi on Improving the Environment for the Human Spirit
Conversation with the President

Living people
Juilliard School faculty
University of Connecticut alumni
The Fletcher School at Tufts University alumni
Yale University alumni
University of Cincinnati faculty
1947 births
Yale School of Music faculty
Manhattan School of Music faculty
Presidents of the Juilliard School